"Invisible String" (stylized in all lowercase) is a song by American singer-songwriter Taylor Swift. It is the eleventh track on her eighth studio album, Folklore, which was released on July 24, 2020 through Republic Records. Swift wrote the song with its producer Aaron Dessner.

As the title suggests, the song centers on an invisible "thread of gold" that connects two soulmates and ushers them together in life, alluding to the East Asian folk myth called the Red Thread of Fate. It is an airy, folk tune with country elements, set to plucked strums of rubber-bridge guitar, fingerpicked acoustics, and back beats. Its lyrics depict Swift's perspective of fate and destiny, using specific details that entwine select moments from her life and her lover's, the twists and turns that led the two former strangers to find each other, and narrates the pursuit of emotional healing and happiness through time.

The song was well received by music critics, who admired its "lovely" instrumentation and innovative lyricism. It has been noted for being the only song on Folklore free of melancholia. NPR named it one of the best songs of 2020. "Invisible String" entered the top 20 on the Australian and Singaporean singles charts, and the top 40 on the Canadian Hot 100 and U.S. Billboard Hot 100. Swift included "Invisible String" on the set list of the Eras Tour (2023).

Background and release 
Folklore was conceived by Swift as figments of mythopoeic visuals in her mind, a result of her imagination "running wild" while isolating herself during the COVID-19 pandemic. One such imagery was of "a single thread that, for better or for worse, ties you to your fate". This concept gave birth to "Invisible String".

Swift penned "Invisible String", and composed it with Aaron Dessner, who produced the song. On July 23, 2020, Swift announced Folklore and revealed its track listing where "Invisible String" placed at number 11. The album was released on July 24, 2020. As a reference to the song, a golden thread was featured in the music video for "Willow" (2020), the lead single of Swift's ninth studio album and Folklore sequel, Evermore.

Composition and lyrics 

"Invisible String" is a folk song with an airy and earthy instrumentation driven by acoustic riff and thumping vocal backbeats. Dessner stated that he used a rubber bridge for the song's prominent guitar line.

"Invisible String" is a restrained love song, without blatant references to romance. Its lyrics give glimpses into Swift's relationship with English actor Joe Alwyn, who also co-wrote and co-produced a few tracks on Folklore; it recounts the "invisible" thread existing between the two former strangers that they were not aware of until they met and fell in love. The song is an allusion to the East Asian folk myth called the red thread of fate, which originated from Chinese mythology. According to the belief, an invisible red cord (colored golden in Swift's interpretation) is tied around the finger of those that are destined to meet one another in a certain situation as they are "their true love".

Swift employs a distinct passive writing style in the song, and uses colors to paint memories. It incorporates ultra-specific details, such as: Swift's affinity to Nashville's Centennial Park, Alwyn's time spent working at a London frozen yogurt shop before venturing into acting, and Swift mailing gifts to the expectant child of her ex-lover Joe Jonas and wife Sophie Turner. There are also allusions to her older songs in "Invisible String": the lyric "Bad was the blood of the song in the cab on your first trip to L.A." referring to "Bad Blood" (2015), the dive bar in "Delicate" (2017), and golden hues–the color of love according to Swift–in "Daylight" (2019). "Invisible String" also mentions her three-year trip with Alwyn to Lake District, England, which is the narrative setting of "The Lakes", the bonus track of Folklore deluxe edition.

Critical reception 
Pitchfork critic Julian Mapes praised "Invisible String" as one of the "loveliest" songs on Folklore for its "delightfully plucky" instrumentals and standout lyricism, which Mapes paralleled with lines from classic novels Jane Eyre (1847) and The Sun Also Rises (1926). Ranking the song as the second best of the album, Mikael Wood of The Los Angeles Times said that, unlike the rest of Folklore, "Invisible String" has Swift look back on her life and rephrase its "tabloid representation" to provide "a very cleverly phrased account of the twists and turns that led her to meet her boyfriend, British actor Joe Alwyn." He admired Swift's "whimsical and luscious" vocals as well. PopMatters writer Michael Sumsion opined that the song demonstrates "a natural affinity for the campfire as the sky-bound plinking guitar bursts into an acoustic charge of pastoral loveliness".

Insider critics agreed that "Invisible String" is "Taylor Swift at her most Taylor Swift"; Callie Ahlgrim wrote that the song "is a feast of Easter eggs and callbacks" with a "sprightly and sparkly" musicality, meanwhile Courtesy Larocca remarked it as "a rosy, wide-eyed ode to love", accentuated by plucky strums and Swift's soft vocals. Chris Willman of Variety asserted that "Invisible String" is a "bless the broken roads that led me to you"-type song that finds Swift fulfilled and content. Jon Caramanica of The New York Times commented that the song is the only "truly hopeful-sounding song" on Folklore and the only one "about a happy, fulfilled relationship", features some of Swift's most vivid lyrics.

Jonathan Keefe, writing for Slant, reviewed that "Invisible String" displays Swift's "masterful grasp of song structure", and highlighted how each of its stanzas begins with the use of passive voice "to create a narrative remove". Katie Moulton, writing for Consequence of Sound, lauded Swift's mythopoeic prowess. In the words of New Statesman critic Anna Leszkiewicz, "Invisible String" is "immediately less distant and hazy" than other songs of Folklore, seeing Swift imagine "an invisible thread linking her with her partner, as their paths cross over years, before eventually becoming knitted together". Leszkiewicz also called it a "pleasingly restrained" love song, and "the romantic high-point of the album".

In her list ranking all 161 songs by Swift back then, Hannah Mylrea of NME placed the song at number 31, calling it a "sweet ode to Swift’s past relationships, and how they lead her to where she currently is". NPR placed "Invisible String" at number 22 on its ranking of 100 best songs of 2020, for "all the beautiful detail, all the muscular melody and immaculately placed acoustic production details" takes a mature perspective in celebrating of "the fact that love doesn't have to paint the entire world to change your life; one tiny thread of gold can be enough."

Commercial performance 
Following Folklore release, all of the album's tracks entered the US Billboard Hot 100. "Invisible String" debuted at number 37 on the chart, alongside 9 other tracks from Folklore to land inside the top 40; it charted for two weeks before its exit. It further reached number 19 on the Singapore Singles chart, number 19 on Australia's ARIA Singles Chart, and number 29 on the Canadian Hot 100.

Credits and personnel
Credits adapted from the album's liner notes and Pitchfork

 Taylor Swift – vocals, songwriter
 Aaron Dessner – producer, songwriter, recording engineer, acoustic guitar, bass, drum programming, Mellotron, electric guitar, percussion, piano, synthesizer
 Yuki Numata Resnick – viola, violin
 Clarice Jensen – cello
 James McAllister – drum programming
 Jonathan Low – mixing, recording engineer
 Randy Merrill – mastering engineer
 Kyle Resnick – engineer

Charts

References

2020 songs
Taylor Swift songs
Songs written by Taylor Swift
Songs written by Aaron Dessner
Song recordings produced by Aaron Dessner
American folk songs